The 2014 Junior Pan American Artistic Gymnastics Championships was held in Aracaju, Brazil, March 26–30, 2014.

Medal summary

Source:

Medal table

References

Junior Pan American Artistic Gymnastics Championships
Junior Pan American Artistic Gymnastics Championships
Junior Pan American Artistic Gymnastics Championships
Pan American Gymnastics Championships
International gymnastics competitions hosted by Brazil